A number of local elections took place in Mexico during 2005:

6 February 2005

Baja California Sur
Governor, five mayors, and  21 (15+6) local deputies 
See: 2005 Baja California Sur state election

Guerrero
Governor, mayors, and local congress
See: 2005 Guerrero state election

Quintana Roo
Governor, eight mayors, and 25 (15+10) local deputies
See: 2005 Quintana Roo state election

20 February 2005

Hidalgo
Governor, mayors, and local congress
See: 2005 Hidalgo state election

10 April 2005

Colima
Governor (extraordinary election) 
See: 2005 Colima state election

3 July 2005

Nayarit
Governor, mayors, and local congress
See: 2005 Nayarit state election

Estado de México
Governor
See: 2005 México state election

25 September 2005

Coahuila
Governor, mayors, local congress
See: 2005 Coahuila state election